Matchless Mountain may refer to:

 Matchless Mountain (Antarctica), a mountain in the Convoy Range, Victoria Land, Antarctica
 Matchless Mountain (Colorado), a mountain in the Elk Mountains, Colorado, USA